The Paragould Browns (also known as the Rebels and the Scouts) were a minor league baseball team that represented Paragould, Arkansas in the Northeast Arkansas League from 1909 to 1911 and from 1936 to 1941.

References
Baseball Reference

Baseball teams established in 1939
Baseball teams disestablished in 1941
Defunct Northeast Arkansas League teams
Professional baseball teams in Arkansas
St. Louis Browns minor league affiliates
1941 disestablishments in Arkansas
1939 establishments in Arkansas
Paragould, Arkansas
Defunct baseball teams in Arkansas
Northeast Arkansas League teams